Trench Road is a 2004 Finnish drama film directed by Veikko Aaltonen. Based on the Nordic Council's Literature Prize-winning novel Juoksuhaudantie by Kari Hotakainen, the film is about a man who tries to get his wife and daughter back by buying a house.

Kari Väänänen won the Jussi Award for Best Supporting Actor for his role as the real estate agent Jarmo Kesämaa. Eero Aho and Tiina Lymi were nominated for Jussi Awards for Best Actor and Best Actress.

Cast 
 Eero Aho as Matti Virtanen
 Tiina Lymi as Helena Virtanen
 Ella Aho as Sini Virtanen
 Kari Väänänen as Jarmo Kesämaa
 Esko Pesonen as Taisto Oksanen
 Aake Kalliala as the foreman Siikavire
 Eeva Litmanen as Senior Constable Kalliolahti
 Matleena Kuusniemi as Sirkku
 Kaija Pakarinen as Merja Kesämaa
 Katariina Kaitue as Riitta Laakio
 Eila Roine as Martta Oksanen

References

External links 
 

2004 drama films
Films based on Finnish novels
Films set in Finland
Films shot in Finland
Finnish drama films